Confessions of a Frustrated Housewife is a 1976 Italian drama film directed by Andrea Bianchi and starring Carroll Baker.

Cast
 Carroll Baker as Laura
 Adolfo Celi as Antonio Lenzini
 Cesare Barro as Claudio
 Luigi Pistilli as Carlo
 Gabriella Giorgelli as Prostitute
 Dada Gallotti as Patrizia's friend
 Caterina Barbero as Gabriella
 Carla Spessato as Magda
 Femi Benussi as Patrizia
 Jenny Tamburi as Diana

See also
 List of Italian films of 1976

References

External links

1976 films
1976 drama films
Italian drama films
1970s Italian-language films
Films directed by Andrea Bianchi
Films scored by Guido & Maurizio De Angelis
1970s Italian films